The  (also called Ebisu and Ezo), written with Kanji that literally mean "shrimp barbarians," constituted an ancient ethnic group of people who lived in parts of Honshū, especially in the Tōhoku region, referred to as  in contemporary sources. 

Some Emishi tribes resisted the rule of various Japanese Emperors during the Asuka, Nara and early Heian periods (7th–10th centuries AD).

The origin of the Emishi is disputed. They are often thought to have descended from some tribes of the Jōmon people. Some historians believe that they were related to the Ainu people, but others disagree with this theory and see them as a completely distinct ethnicity. Recent evidence suggests that the Emishi that inhabited Northern Honshu consisted of several distinct tribes (which included pre-Ainu people, non-Yamato Japanese, and admixed people), who united and resisted the expansion of the Yamato Empire. It is suggested that the Emishi spoke a divergent Japonic language, similar to the historical Izumo dialect.

Etymology
The first mention of the Emishi is from a Chinese source, the Book of Song in 478 CE, which referred to them as "hairy people". The book refers to "the 55 kingdoms of the hairy people of the East" as a report by King Bu — one of the Five kings of Wa.

This is in the record of Emperor Jimmu, stating that his armed forces defeated a group of Emishi before Jimmu was enthroned as the Emperor of Japan.

The use of the "shrimp" spelling is thought to refer to facial hair, like the long whiskers of a shrimp, but this is not certain. The "barbarian" portion clearly described an outsider, living beyond the borders of the emerging empire of Japan, which saw itself as a civilizing influence; thus, the empire was able to justify its conquest. This kanji spelling was first seen in the T'ang sources that describe the meeting with the two Emishi that the Japanese envoy brought with him to China. The kanji spelling may have been adopted from China.

The oldest attested pronunciation   may have come from Old Japanese, perhaps from the word  meaning "bowyer" (in reference to an important weapon, the bow), however some suggest that it came instead from the Ainu term  meaning "sword".

History
The Emishi in northeastern Honshū relied on horses in warfare, developing a unique style of warfare in which horse archery and hit-and-run tactics proved very effective against the slower contemporary Japanese imperial army that mostly relied on heavy infantry. The livelihood of the Emishi was based on hunting and gathering as well as on the cultivation of grains such as millet and barley. Recently, it has been thought that they practiced rice cultivation in areas where rice could be easily grown. 

The first major attempts to subjugate the Emishi in the 8th century were largely unsuccessful. The imperial armies, which were modeled after the mainland Chinese armies, proved unsuccessful when faced with the guerrilla tactics employed by the Emishi. Following the adoption and development by the imperial forces of horseback archery and the guerilla tactics used by the Emishi, the army soon saw success, leading to the eventual defeat of the Emishi. The success of the gradual change in battle tactics came at the very end of the 8th century in the 790s under the command of the general Sakanoue no Tamuramaro. The adoption of horseback archery and horseback combat later led to the development of the samurai. Following their defeat, the 

By the mid-9th century, most of the land held by the Emishi in Honshū had been conquered, and the Emishi became part of wider Japanese society. However, they continued to be influential in local politics, as subjugated, though powerful, Emishi families created semi-autonomous feudal domains in the north. In the two centuries following the conquest, a few of these domains became regional states that came into conflict with the central government.

Amongst these Eastern savages the Yemishi are the most powerful; their men and women live together promiscuously; there is no distinction of father and child. In winter, they dwell in holes; in summer, they live in nests. Their clothing consists of furs, and they drink blood. Brothers are suspicious of one another. In ascending mountains, they are like flying birds; in going through the grass, they are like fleet quadrupeds. When they receive a favour, they forget it, but if an injury is done them they never fail to revenge it. Therefore, they keep arrows in their top-knots and carry swords within their clothing. Sometimes, they draw together their fellows and make inroads on the frontier. At other times, they take the opportunity of the harvest to plunder the people. If attacked, they conceal themselves in the herbage; if pursued, they flee into the mountains. Therefore, ever since antiquity, they have not been steeped in the kingly civilizing influences.

Battles with Yamato army
The 's entry for Emperor Yūryaku, also known as Ohatsuse no Wakatakeru, records an uprising, after the Emperor's death, of Emishi troops who had been levied to support an expedition to Korea. Emperor Yūryaku is suspected to be King Bu, but the date and the existence of Yūryaku are uncertain, and the Korean reference may be anachronistic. However, the compilers clearly felt that the reference to Emishi troops was credible in this context.

In 658, Abe no Hirafu's naval expedition of 180 ships reached Aguta (present day Akita Prefecture) and Watarishima (Hokkaidō). An alliance with Aguta Emishi, Tsugaru Emishi and Watarishima Emishi was formed by Abe who then stormed and defeated a settlement of the Mishihase (Su-shen in the Aston translation of the ), a people of unknown origin. This is one of the earliest reliable records of the Emishi people extant. The Mishihase may have been another ethnic group who competed with the ancestors of the Ainu for Hokkaidō. The expedition happens to be the furthest northern penetration of the Japanese Imperial army until the 16th century, and that later settlement was from a local Japanese warlord who was independent of any central control.

In 709, the fort of Ideha was created close to present day Akita. This was a bold move since the intervening territory between Akita and the northwestern countries of Japan was not under government control. The Emishi of Akita, in alliance with Michinoku, attacked Japanese settlements in response. Saeki no Iwayu was appointed Sei Echigo Emishi . He used 100 ships from the Japan sea side countries along with soldiers recruited from the eastern countries and defeated the Echigo (present day Akita) Emishi.

In 724, Taga Fort was built by Ōno no Omi Azumahito near present-day Sendai and became the largest administrative fort in the northeast region of Michinoku. As Chinju , he steadily built forts across the Sendai plain and into the interior mountains in what is now Yamagata Prefecture.

In 758, after a long period of stalemate, the Japanese army under Fujiwara no Asakari penetrated into what is now northern Miyagi Prefecture, and established Momonofu Castle on the Kitakami River. The fort was built despite constant attacks by the Emishi of Isawa (present-day southern Iwate prefecture).

Thirty-Eight Years' War

773 AD marked the beginning of the Thirty-Eight Years' War with the defection of Korehari no Azamaro, a high-ranking Emishi officer of the Japanese army based in Taga Castle. The Emishi counterattacked along a broad front, starting with Momonohu Castle, destroying the garrison there before going on to destroy a number of forts along a defensive line from east to west established painstakingly over the past generation. Even Taga Castle was not spared. Large Japanese forces were recruited, numbering in the thousands, the largest forces perhaps ten to twenty thousand strong fighting against an  force that numbered at most around three thousand warriors, and at any one place around a thousand. In 776 a huge army of over 20,000 men was sent to attack the Shiwa Emishi, an effort that failed, before the Shiwa Emishi launched a successful counterattack in the Ōu Mountains. In 780, the Emishi attacked the Sendai plain, torching Japanese villages there. The Japanese were in a near panic as they tried to tax and recruit more soldiers from the Bandō.

In the 789 AD Battle of Koromo River (also known as Battle of Sufuse) the Japanese army under Ki no Kosami Seito  was defeated by the Isawa Emishi under their general Aterui. A four thousand-strong army was attacked as they tried to cross the Kitakami River by a force of a thousand Emishi. The imperial army suffered its most stunning defeat, losing a thousand men, many of whom drowned.

In 794, many key Shiwa Emishi, including Isawa no kimi Anushiko of what is now northern Miyagi Prefecture, became allies of the Japanese. This was a stunning reversal to the aspirations of the Emishi who still fought against the Japanese. The Shiwa Emishi were a very powerful group and were able to attack smaller Emishi groups successfully as their leaders were promoted into imperial rank. This had the effect of isolating one of the most powerful and independent Emishi, the Isawa confederation. The newly appointed  general Sakanoue no Tamuramaro then attacked the Isawa Emishi, relentlessly using soldiers trained in horse archery. The result was a desultory campaign that eventually led to Aterui's surrender in 802. The war was mostly over and many Emishi groups submitted themselves to the imperial government. However, skirmishes still took place, and it was not until 811 that the so-called Thirty-Eight Years' War was over. North of the Kitakami River, the Emishi were still independent, but the large scale threat that they posed ceased with the defeat of the Isawa Emishi in 802.

Abe clan, Kiyowara clan and the Northern Fujiwara

After their conquest, some Emishi leaders became part of the regional framework of government in the Tōhoku culminating with the Northern Fujiwara regime. This regime and others such as the Abe and Kiyowara were created by local Japanese  and became regional semi-independent states based on the Emishi and Japanese people. However, even before these emerged, the Emishi people progressively lost their distinct culture and ethnicity as they became minorities.

The Northern Fujiwara were thought to have been Emishi, but there is some doubt as to their lineage, and most likely were descended from local Japanese families who resided in the Tōhoku (unrelated to the Fujiwara of Kyoto). Both the Abe and Kiyowara families were almost certainly of Japanese descent, both of whom represented , powerful families who had moved into the provinces of Mutsu and Dewa perhaps during the 9th century, though when they emigrated is not known for certain. They were likely Japanese frontier families who developed regional ties with the descendants of the Emishi , and may have been seen as  themselves since they had lived in the region for several generations. Importantly, the Abe held the post of Superintendent of the indigenous. This post proves that the Emishi population was seen as different from other Japanese though it is unclear what the responsibilities of the post were.

Soon after World War II, mummies of the Northern Fujiwara family in Hiraizumi (the capital city of the Northern Fujiwara), who were thought to have been related to the Ainu, were studied by scientists. However, the researchers concluded that the rulers of Hiraizumi were not related to the ethnic Ainu but more similar to contemporary Japanese of Honshū. This was seen as evidence that the Emishi were not related to the Ainu. This had the effect of popularizing the idea that the Emishi were like other contemporary ethnic Japanese who lived in northeastern Japan, outside of Yamato rule. However, the reason the study of the Northern Fujiwara was done was the assumption that they were Emishi, which they were not. They were descendants of the northern Fujiwara branch from Tsunekiyo and the Abe clan. They took liberties with giving themselves Emishi titles because they had become rulers of the previous Emishi held lands of the Tohoku.

Ethnic relations

Emishi–Ainu theory
Many theories abound as to the precise ethnic relations of the Emishi to other ethnic groups within Japan; one theory suggests that the Emishi are related to the Ainu people. This theory is considered controversial, as many Emishi tribes were known as excellent horse archers and warriors; although the Ainu are also known as archers, they did not use horses and their war-style was clearly different. They also differed in cultural terms. Despite the cultural differences, the Jōmon people are considered the ancestors of both Emishi and Ainu in historical progression, and the names for Emishi and Ezo are the same kanji character; it is already known that the name 'Ezo' was used in the early medieval period for the people of the Tsugaru peninsula, and that the Jōmon inhabitants of Hokkaido were ancestral to the Ainu directly, so this is a logical progression according to this theory. The Esan culture of northern Honshu is associated with this population and later gave rise to the Satsumon culture which played an important role in the formation of modern Ainu people of Hokkaido. The Emishi were horse riders and iron workers (unlike the Ainu). While there is evidence for some agriculture (millet and rice), they were mostly horse riders, hunters, fishers and traders.

Recent studies suggest that Ainu-speaking people joined with the local Japonic-speaking peoples to resist the expansion of the Yamato empire. The Matagi are suggested to be the descendants of these Ainu-speakers from Hokkaido which also contributed several toponyms and loanwords, related to geography and certain forest and water animals which they hunted, to the local Japonic-speaking people.

Studies of the skeletal features of the Jōmon culture populations has shown unexpected heterogeneity among the native population, suggesting multiple origin and diverse ethnic groups. A 2014 anthropologic and genetic study concluded: "In this respect, the biological identity of the Jōmon period population is heterogeneous, and it may be indicative of diverse peoples who possibly belonged to a common culture, known as the Jomon".

Emishi-Izumo/Zuzu theories
There are several historians and linguists which propose that the Emishi spoke a divergent Japonic language, most likely the ancient "Zūzū dialect" (the ancestor of Tōhoku dialect) and are a different ethnic group from the Ainu and early Yamato. They were likely ethnic Japanese, which resisted against the Yamato dynasty and allied themselves with other local tribes. Especially the similarity of the modern Tōhoku dialect and the ancient Izumo dialect, supports that some of the Izumo people, who did not obey Yamato royalty after the delegation of governance, escaped to the Tōhoku region and became the Emishi.

Recent studies, such as Boer et al. 2020, concluded that the Emishi predominantly spoke a Japonic language, closely related to the Izumo dialect. Additionally, the evidence of rice cultivation by the Emishi and the use of horses, strengthen the link between ancient Izumo Japanese and the Emishi. According to the theory, the Emishi are the Izumo Japanese, who were pushed away from the Yamato Japanese, who did not accept any concurrence to the imperial rule.

Tungusic theory 
Several historians noted striking similarities between the horseriding nomads of the Amur region, specifically Tungusic peoples, and the Emishi. It is suggested that the Emishi originated from a Tungusic source population, which later assimilated Japonic-speaking Izumo migrants. Oishi Naomasa, Emuri Susumi, and others link the Emishi to the semi-nomadic Malgal/Mohe people. There was also a distinction between contemporary Honshu Emishi and Watarishima Emishi of Hokkaido. Historical evidence suggests frequent fights between Honshu Emishi and Watarishima Emishi. It is argued that the Watarishima Emishi consisted of Honshu Emishi and proto-Ainu-speakers. Kudo Masaki and Kitakamae Yasuo concluded that the Emishi were of predominantly Tungusic origin with some assimilated Japonic groups (Izumo people). They further argue that linguistic place names (toponyms) previously suggested to be Ainu, can be explained by Amur Tungusic substratum onto proto-Ainu. Kudo also suggests that the Matagi hunters are in fact descendants of the Emishi, with the specific hunting vocabulary to be of Tungusic rather than Ainu origin. Kikuchi Toshihiko argues that there was much contact between the aboriginal peoples in northern Honshu and Hokkaido who formed the Satsumon and Okhotsk cultures and Tungusic and Paleoasiatic groups in the Russian Far East, especially along the Amur River Basin and on the Manchurian Plain.

In popular culture
The term "Emishi" is used for the concealed village tribe of the main character Ashitaka in the Hayao Miyazaki animated film Princess Mononoke. The village was a last pocket of Emishi surviving into the Muromachi period (16th century).

See also
 Satsumon culture

Notes

References

External links

Who Were the Emishi?
Conquest of Emishi
Ainu Origins from the Field Museum of Natural History site
Emishi: a more in-depth interpretation of recent research
Aterui the Great

Oni

Ainu history
Ethnic groups in Japan
Extinct ethnic groups
People of Asuka-period Japan
People of Nara-period Japan
People of Heian-period Japan
Tribes of ancient Japan